Bokani is a village in Kneževo, Bosnia and Herzegovina.

Bokani may also refer to:

Bokani Dam, in Maharashtra, India
Bokani, a sub-district of Mokwa, Niger State, Nigeria
Bokani Dyer (born 1986), Motswana-South African pianist, composer, and music producer
Bokani Soko, Zambian lawyer and businessman